The Rhine Taunus Nature Park, located in the Rheingau-Taunus-Kreis and Wiesbaden district of Hesse, Germany was founded in 1968. It includes the western part of the Taunus and extends over the Idsteiner Becken to the Rhine. It is characterized by a roughly 60 percent forested low mountain landscape, which falls away steeply toward the Rhine Gorge.

External links 

  (German only)

Nature parks in Hesse
Rheingau